The Taça Asa Branca, was a kind of football super cup tournament, reuniting the winners of Copa do Nordeste and Copa Verde, the two minor (regional) cups of the Brazilian football pyramid. There were only two editions (one of them with an invited team), and it was discontinued due to lack of available dates.

List of Champions

Matches

2016 Taça Asa Branca

2017 Taça Asa Branca

External links

See also 

Supercopa do Brasil

References 

Recurring sporting events established in 2016
Recurring sporting events disestablished in 2018
Defunct football competitions in Brazil